Jesús 'Chus' Landáburu Sagüillo (born 24 January 1955) is a Spanish former footballer who played as a central midfielder.

Club career
Landáburu was born in Guardo, Province of Palencia. He made his professional debut at only 17 with Real Valladolid, quickly making an impression with the Segunda División club, his skills, field vision and set piece ability standing out alike.

Landáburu first appeared in La Liga with Madrid-based Rayo Vallecano, in the 1977–78 campaign. He contributed heavily to the modest team's maintenance of their top flight status during two seasons, after which he signed with league powerhouse FC Barcelona.

Landáburu won his first piece of silverware with the Catalans in 1981, the Copa del Rey. After two good seasons, he struggled immensely in his last as Barça hired a new coach, German Udo Lattek.

Landáburu moved subsequently to Atlético Madrid, being an automatic first-choice throughout six seasons (nearly 300 official appearances for the Colchoneros). At the end of 1987–88, however, mainly due to serious personal problems with elusive club chairman Jesús Gil, he chose to retire at the age of 33; still an active player, he majored in physics.

International career
Landáburu played once for Spain, the second half of a 23 January 1980 friendly with the Netherlands in Vigo (1–0 win).

Honours
Barcelona
Copa del Rey: 1980–81

Atlético Madrid
Copa del Rey: 1984–85
Supercopa de España: 1985
UEFA Cup Winners' Cup runner-up: 1985–86

References

External links

1955 births
Living people
Sportspeople from the Province of Palencia
Spanish footballers
Footballers from Castile and León
Association football midfielders
La Liga players
Segunda División players
Real Valladolid players
Rayo Vallecano players
FC Barcelona players
Atlético Madrid footballers
Spain amateur international footballers
Spain international footballers